Tuan Yuan may refer to:

Apart Together, 2010 Chinese film
Wax and Wane, 2011 Hong Kong TV series

See also
Tuan Tuan and Yuan Yuan, giant pandas at Taipei Zoo, Taiwan